Kaynardzha Municipality is a municipality (obshtina) in Silistra Province, Northeastern Bulgaria, located in the Danubian Plain, in the area of the South Dobrudzha geographical region, bounded on the north with Romania. The Danube river is about 25 km away to the north through the Romanian territory. The area is named after its administrative centre – the village of Kaynardzha.

The municipality embraces a territory of 314.96 km2 with a population of 5,250 inhabitants, as of December 2009.

The main road II-71 crosses the area from northwest to southeast, connecting the province centre of Silistra with the city of Dobrich.

Settlements 

Kaynardzha Municipality includes the following 15 places all of them villages:

Demography 
The following table shows the change of the population during the last four decades.

Demographic indicators 
As of 2016, it is one of the few places in Bulgaria with a natural population growth: there were a total of 87 live births, while 66 people died. The crude birth rate is 17.0‰, while the crude death rate is around 12.9‰. The municipality of Kaynardzha has a total fertility rate of 2.57 children per woman, which is much higher than the average for the country (1.54 children per woman).

Ethnic groups 
Turks form the majority of the population of Kaynardzha Municipality. Bulgarians constitutie the largest minority, followed by a large Roma population.

Religion 
In 2011, about 67.8% of the total population declared to be Muslim. The municipality of Kaynardzha has the highest share of Shia people in Bulgaria: around 52% of the population declared to be Shia in the census of 2001. About 27% of the population belong to the Bulgarian Orthodox Church.

Age structure 
The municipality of Kaynardzha has a very young population compared to other places in Bulgaria.

See also
Provinces of Bulgaria
Municipalities of Bulgaria
List of cities and towns in Bulgaria

References

External links
 Info website 

Municipalities in Silistra Province